Jaszkowo  is a village in the administrative district of Gmina Brodnica, within Śrem County, Greater Poland Voivodeship, in west-central Poland.

Jaszkowo is situated on the Warta River on the left bank.

History

Jaszkowo was first mentioned in 1266, it also mentions Chwalamir, the owner of the village. It is confirmed in the documents of Przemsył II.

From 1975 to 1998, Jaszkowo administratively belonged to Poznań Voivodeship.

References

External links
 Antoni Chłapowski's Equestrian Centre
 Palace in Jaszkowo

Villages in Śrem County